In Korean art history, the Baekje smile is the common smile motif found in Baekje sculpture and bas-relief.  Baekje figures express a unique smile that has been described as both enigmatic and subtle.  The smile has been also been characterized in many different ways from "genuinely glowing" to "thin and mild" to "unfathomable and benevolent".

Among the Three Kingdoms of Korea, Baekje art was stylistically the most realistic and technically sophisticated.   While Goguryeo sculpture was highly rigid, and Silla sculpture was formalized, Baekje sculpture exhibited distinct characteristics of warmth, softness, and used relaxed poses.  Sometimes, the Baekje style has been attributed to influence from the southern Chinese dynasties.   The smile gives the Baekje statues a sense of friendliness and an air of pleasantness that is rarely found in other traditions of Buddhist sculpture. The smile is considered to be unique and distinctive.

See also
 Archaic smile
 Baekje
 Korean art
Gilt-bronze Maitreya in Meditation

References

External links
  Britannica 
 Cultural Development of the Three Kingdoms
 9th Century Korean Bronze Buddha Shakyamuni
 Meditating Bodhisattva – Musée National Des Arts Asiatiques-Guimet
 The Three Kingdoms Period of Korea – ROK embassy to the US
 Korean Influence on Japanese Culture

Baekje
Korean art
Visual motifs
Iconography